The naval Second Battle of Playa Honda (Spanish: Segunda La Batalla Naval de Playa Honda; Filipino: Ikalawang Labanan sa Playa Honda), was the first of three known minor conflicts during the Eighty Years' War between the United Provinces and Spain held in Playa Honda (present-day Botolan) in the Philippines. 

All the battles were won by the Spanish. The first battle occurred in 1610. The second and most famous took place in 1617. The third battle took place in 1624.

Notes and references

Playa Honda 1617
Playa Honda 1617
Playa Honda
Playa Honda
Playa Honda
History of Zambales
1624 in Asia